Allan McDonald was a 19th-century Member of Parliament from the Gisborne Region of New Zealand.

The next year he was elected mayor of Gisborne unopposed, but resigned before the 1886 election due to the death of his property manager. He went missing on 24 May 1893, last being seen at a hotel on Flinders Street in Melbourne.

See also
List of people who disappeared

References

1890s missing person cases
19th-century New Zealand politicians
Mayors of Gisborne, New Zealand
Members of the New Zealand House of Representatives
Missing person cases in Australia
New Zealand MPs for North Island electorates
Unsuccessful candidates in the 1887 New Zealand general election
Year of birth missing
Year of death missing